Mariana Rossi (born 2 January 1979 in Vicente López, Buenos Aires) is an Argentine field hockey player, who won a bronze medal with the national women's hockey team at the 2008 Summer Olympics in Beijing. Mariana has also won the World Cup in 2010, two Champions Trophy (2008, 2010) and the gold medal at the Pan American Cup in 2013.

External links
 
 The Official Website of the Beijing 2008 Olympic Games
 Confederación Argentina de Hockey Official site of the Argentine Hockey Confederation 
 

1979 births
Argentine people of Italian descent
Living people
Argentine female field hockey players
Las Leonas players
Female field hockey defenders
Olympic field hockey players of Argentina
Field hockey players at the 2008 Summer Olympics
Olympic bronze medalists for Argentina
Olympic medalists in field hockey
Medalists at the 2008 Summer Olympics
People from Vicente López Partido
Sportspeople from Buenos Aires Province